St. Joseph's Church, Shaoxing, locally known as St. Joseph's Church, Bazi Bridge, is a Roman Catholic church located in Yuecheng District of Shaoxing, Zhejiang, China.

History 
The church was originally built by French missionary Andre Rene Guillot (1820–1887) in 1871. An extension of the entire church complex was carried out in 1903 by Italian missionary Jaoques Chianello (1865–1927), and was completed in 1907. Soon after, Benevolence Hall, Nursing Home, Nursery, Peide Primary School, Convenient Cloth Factory and Convenient Match Factory was successively added to the church.

The church was occupied by the Shaoxing Opera Troupe during the ten-year Cultural Revolution, and was officially reopened to the public in July 1988. In May 1993, it was designated as a municipal cultural relic preservation organ by the Shaoxing government.

Gallery

References

Further reading 
 
 

Churches in Shaoxing
1907 establishments in China
Churches completed in 1907
Romanesque Revival church buildings in China
Tourist attractions in Shaoxing